Asura fulvimarginata is a moth of the family Erebidae. It is found in India.

References

fulvimarginata
Moths described in 1904
Moths of Asia